Don Charles (10 December 1933 – 4 December 2005) was a popular English ballad singer, and record producer, and later in his life, a writer of a self-help book. He is best known for his recordings of "Walk With Me My Angel" and "Bring Your Love to Me". He also produced several of The Tornados' tracks including "Space Walk" and "Goodbye Joe". The latter title referred his original mentor and producer, Joe Meek. Meek regarded Charles highly. "You are my only legit artist", Meek once informed Charles. "All the others are yugga-dugs".

Life and career
He was born Walter Stanley Scuffham in Kingston upon Hull, East Yorkshire, England. His father died when the youngster was aged four, and using his childhood nickname of Don he later adopted his stepfather's surname, becoming for a while Don Bennett.

He spent ten years in the Royal Navy, leaving at 25 years old with ambitions to become a professional singer. By 1960, after settling in London, he was signed to Parlophone by George Martin who produced his debut single, "Paintbox Lover". His stay with the label was short-lived, and he was signed by Joe Meek to Decca in 1961. He was renamed Don Charles to avoid potential confusion with Tony Bennett, and released his biggest seller "Walk With Me My Angel" in January 1962. Written by Geoff Goddard, and produced by Meek, the single just made the Top 40 in the UK Singles Chart. Not that he knew it at the time, but lack of further chart activity, would leave Charles with the one-hit wonder tag. He appeared on several teen based television programmes, and released a cover version of Ben E. King's hit "The Hermit of Misty Mountain" in 1962, and the country music influenced novelty "It's My Way of Loving You" the same year.

Ill fortune followed when the BBC refused to play his 1963 follow-up "Angel of Love". This was because of the 'death song' styled lyric, "Everyone has an angel of love/Way up in the heavens above". This, combined with the all-pervading appearance of The Beatles, dealt a hammer blow to his career. The hastily released "Heart's Ice Cold" failed to find any buyers, and when Meek fell out with Decca, he took Charles with him to HMV.

Charles released seven singles for HMV between 1963 and 1966, which included "Tower Tall", "Big Talk from a Little Man" (written by Alan Klein) and "Dream on Little Dreamer", but commercial success continued to elude him. In 1965, Charles produced The Tornados' numbers, "Space Walk" and "Goodbye Joe". In an unusual move Charles returned to Parlophone in 1967, and released the Northern soul favourite, "Bring Your Love to Me", and several other unsuccessful singles. He then retired from the music industry, except for a brief return using a derivation of his birth name as Sgt. Will Scuffham, releasing in 1970 on MCA UK "And They All Came Marching Home" and "Lili Marleen". He had been encouraged to release a pseudo-military pop song after his friend Rolf Harris had a success with "Two Little Boys". At that time he also jointly bought a nightclub in Malta with Rolf Harris. When that venture fell flat, Charles became a used car salesman and, in 1989, he penned a successful book based upon his experiences, entitled How to Buy a Used Car (And Save Money).

Charles was a keen and gifted amateur photographer and undertook a large number of portraits of local people, both famous and not so well known in the Primrose Hill area, where he lived in the 1960s and 1970s.

Four times married with five daughters, Charles died in December 2005, in Herstmonceux, East Sussex, less than a week away from his 72nd birthday.

He is not to be confused with another Don Charles, a Scandinavian-based record producer behind the musical recording project the Singing Dogs.

Discography

Singles

† Billed as Don Bennett

EPs

Bibliography
How to Buy a Used Car (And Save Money) (1989) –

References

External links
Biography at Yahoo.com
Mini biography at Kinemagigz.com

1933 births
2005 deaths
English male singers
English pop singers
English record producers
English self-help writers
Musicians from Kingston upon Hull
Traditional pop music singers
Decca Records artists
Parlophone artists
20th-century English singers
20th-century British male singers
20th-century British businesspeople